The 2011 Open GDF Suez was a women's professional tennis tournament played on indoor hard courts. It was the 19th edition of the Open GDF Suez (formerly known as the Open Gaz de France) and was a Premier tournament on the 2011 WTA Tour. It took place at Stade Pierre de Coubertin in Paris, France from 7 February through 13 February 2011.

Entrants

Seeds

1 Rankings as of January 31, 2011.

Other entrants
The following players received wildcards into the main draw:
 Virginie Razzano
 Maria Sharapova
 Yanina Wickmayer

The following players received entry from the qualifying draw:

 Jelena Dokić
 Kristína Kučová
 Vesna Manasieva
 Ana Vrljić

The following players received entry as a lucky loser into the singles main draw:
 Stéphanie Cohen-Aloro

Finals

Singles

 Petra Kvitová defeated  Kim Clijsters, 6–4, 6–3.
It was Kvitová's second title of the year and third career title.

Doubles

 Bethanie Mattek-Sands /  Meghann Shaughnessy defeated  Vera Dushevina /  Ekaterina Makarova, 6–4, 6–2.

External links
Official website

2011 WTA Tour
2011
2011 in French women's sport
2011 in Paris
2011 in French tennis